The 2013 Western Athletic Conference men's soccer season is the eighth season of men's varsity soccer in the conference. The conference first sponsored the sport in 1996, but after eight schools split from the WAC in 1999 to form the Mountain West Conference (MW), the WAC only played the 1999 season before disbanding its men's soccer league.

Changes from 2015 

 None

Teams

Stadiums and locations 

Chicago State is planning to sponsor men's soccer in the foreseeable future. New Mexico State does not sponsor men's soccer. Air Force, Houston Baptist, Incarnate Word, UNLV and San Jose State are affiliate members.

Regular season

Rankings

Postseason

WAC tournament

NCAA tournament

All-WAC awards and teams

See also 
 2016 NCAA Division I men's soccer season
 2016 WAC Men's Soccer Tournament
 2016 Western Athletic Conference women's soccer season

References 

 
2016 NCAA Division I men's soccer season